Football was contested at the 2013 Summer Universiade from July 5 to 16 in Kazan, Russia.

Medal summary

Medal table

Medal events

Men

Sixteen teams participated in the men's tournament.

Teams

Pool A

Pool B

Pool C

 (withdrew)

Pool D

Women

Twelve teams participated in the women's tournament.

Teams

Pool A

Pool B

Pool C

References

External links
2013 Summer Universiade – Football
Results book

 
2013
Football
2013
2013 in association football
2013–14 in Russian football